Cambridge Health Alliance (CHA) is a healthcare provider in Cambridge, Somerville and Boston's metro-north communities in Massachusetts. CHA offers services including primary care, specialty care, and mental health/substance use services. It includes two acute care hospitals, primary care and specialty practice facilities, and the Cambridge Public Health Department. CHA maintains an affiliation with Beth Israel Deaconess Medical Center in Boston and is a Tufts University School of Medicine and Harvard Medical School teaching affiliate.

Locations

CHA includes two acute care hospitals, primary care and specialty practices, and the Cambridge Public Health Department. The two CHA hospitals are Cambridge Hospital and Everett Hospital.

In addition to the two hospitals, CHA has locations in Cambridge, Somerville, Malden, Revere, and Everett.

History

Cambridge Health Alliance (CHA) was created in 1996 when the city-owned Cambridge Hospital merged with private, nonprofit Somerville Hospital. In 2001, Hallmark Health sold the Whidden Hospital to Cambridge Health Alliance. In 2016, the name of Whidden Hospital was changed to CHA Everett Hospital. In 2020, the emergency department at Somerville Hospital became an Urgent Care Center and the name was changed to CHA Somerville Campus. The three hospitals were originally founded around the turn of the 20th century. 

In 2013 Cambridge Health Alliance became affiliated with Beth Israel Deaconess Medical Center. In 2014 its physicians joined BIDCO, the Beth Israel Deaconess Care Organization. CHA is also an affiliate of the Massachusetts General Hospital for Children.

Community programs

The CEO of Cambridge Health Alliance serves as commissioner of public health for the city of Cambridge. Since the system was created in 1996, it has operated the Cambridge Public Health Department through a contract with the city.

As an employer

CHA employs approximately 4,500 staff members in Cambridge, Everett, Malden, Medford, Revere, and Somerville, Massachusetts.
65% of CHA's staff are unionized.  As of 2013, more than 40% of CHA staff (1,600+) live within the area of Cambridge, Chelsea, Everett, Malden, Medford, Revere, Somerville, and Winthrop.

Further information

 Reinert, Sue, "Cambridge Health Alliance, born to serve poor, struggles to stay healthy itself", Cambridge Day, January 8, 2013
 WCVB - Channel 5 Boston, "Harvard Program Focuses On Bedside Manner", WCVB, September 27, 2011
 Bielaszka-DuVernay, Christina, "Taking Public Health Approaches To Care In Massachusetts", Health Affairs, September 2011
Conaboy, Chelsea, "Connecting underserved patients to preventive care", Boston.com, May 23, 2011
Nesin, Marjorie, "Cambridge Health wins Harvard Medical School Diversity Award", Boston.com, May 6, 2011
 Shaw, Gienna, "Case Study: The Coordinated ED", Health Leaders Media Breakthroughs, April 29, 2011
 AAMC, "The Academic Researcher: Bringing Science to Health Care Delivery", Association of American Medical Colleges, April 20, 2011
 Daniel, Seth, "Practicing Teamwork – Revere Clinic is All About Collaboration and Communication", Revere Journal, March 3, 2011
 Parker, Brock, "Check online for hospital emergency room wait times", Boston.com, February 18, 2011
 Laidler, John, "Health care focusing on teamwork", Boston.com, December 16, 2010
 Falco, Miriam, "Study: Lack of breastfeeding costs lives, billions of dollars", CNN.com, April 6, 2010
 Fennimore, Jillian, "Federal funds help heal ailing Cambridge Health Alliance", Cambridge Chronicle, March 25, 2009

References

Hospital networks in the United States
Healthcare in Massachusetts
Government of Cambridge, Massachusetts
Harvard Medical School